2point4 Children is a British television sitcom about a working-class family who live in Chiswick, west London. It originally aired from 1991 to 1999 on BBC 1 over 56 episodes, including five Christmas specials. It was created by Andrew Marshall who wrote all episodes with the exception of three episodes from Series 7 which were written by Paul Alexander, Simon Braithwaite and Paul Smith. The show was originally directed and produced by Richard Boden, but the later series were directed by Nick Wood, Dewi Humphries and produced by Andrew Marshall.

Series overview

Episodes

Series 1 (1991)

Series 2 (1992)

Series 3 (1993)

Series 4 (1994)

Series 5 (1995)

Series 6 (1996)

Series 7 (1998)

Series 8 (1999)

Home media
BBC Enterprises released a video in 1993, comprising the first three episodes of the series, which are known as: Leader of the Pack, Saturday Night and Sunday Morning, and When the Going Gets Tough, the Tough Go Shopping. 

The first three seasons were released individually on Region 2 DVDs by Eureka Video in 2005.  A box set of the first three seasons was subsequently made available in 2008, again through Eureka Video.

References

Notes

External links
List of 2point4 Children episodes at the British Comedy Guide

BBC-related lists
2point4 Children